Kirsty Lee Yallop (born 4 November 1986) is an association football player who represented New Zealand at the international level and last played for Melbourne Victory in Australia's W-League.

Club career
At club level she played for Lynn-Avon United before moving to Kristianstads DFF in Sweden's Damallsvenskan in 2010. For the 2011 season she moved to second-tier side Vittsjö GIK. In her first year at Vittsjö the team attained promotion to Damallsvenskan.

On 31 October 2015, Yallop joined Australian club Brisbane Roar.

On 9 December 2016, Yallop joined Melbourne Victory as an injury replacement for Bianca Henninger. In October 2017, it was confirmed that she did not re-sign with Melbourne Victory for a further season. In 2017 Yallop joined Norwegian side Klepp.

International career
Yallop made her senior international debut in a 6–0 loss to the United States on 10 October 2004.

Yallop captained the U-20 side at the 2006 FIFA U-20 Women's World Championship finals in Russia, where they lost to Australia (3–0) and Russia (3–2), before holding Brazil to a goalless draw,

Yallop was included in the New Zealand squad for the 2008 Summer Olympics, playing the full 90 minutes in each of New Zealand's group games, scoring one of New Zealand's goals in the 2–2 draw with Japan.

Attending her first Women's World Cup at Germany 2011, Yallop earned her 50th cap in her only appearance at the finals in a 1–1 draw with Mexico as New Zealand won their first ever point at a Senior Women's World Cup.

She played in all of New Zealand's games at the 2012 Summer Olympics.

She featured in one of New Zealand's three matches at the 2015 FIFA Women's World Cup in Canada.

On 20 September 2017, after playing two games against United States, Yallop announced her retirement from international football.

Personal life
In December 2017, Yallop's engagement to Klepp IL teammate and Australia international Tameka Butt was announced on Butt's Twitter account. The two were married in Mangawhai, New Zealand on 9 February 2019.

References

External links
 
  (archive)
 
 
 
 

1986 births
Living people
New Zealand women's association footballers
Footballers at the 2008 Summer Olympics
Footballers at the 2012 Summer Olympics
Olympic association footballers of New Zealand
2011 FIFA Women's World Cup players
2015 FIFA Women's World Cup players
Pali Blues players
USL W-League (1995–2015) players
Kristianstads DFF players
Vittsjö GIK players
Brisbane Roar FC (A-League Women) players
Mallbackens IF players
Melbourne Victory FC (A-League Women) players
Damallsvenskan players
A-League Women players
Association footballers from Auckland
New Zealand women's international footballers
Footballers at the 2016 Summer Olympics
LGBT association football players
New Zealand LGBT sportspeople
FIFA Century Club
Women's association football midfielders
Lesbian sportswomen
Expatriate women's footballers in Sweden
Expatriate women's footballers in Norway
Expatriate women's soccer players in the United States
Expatriate women's soccer players in Australia
New Zealand expatriate sportspeople in Sweden
New Zealand expatriate sportspeople in Norway
New Zealand expatriate sportspeople in Australia
New Zealand expatriate sportspeople in the United States
New Zealand expatriate women's association footballers